Apollon Patras Indoor Hall, also known as Perivola Indoor Hall, is an indoor sports arena that is located in Patras, Greece. The arena is known for its unique roof construction, which is made entirely out of wood. The arena belongs to the local multi-sporting club, A.S. Apollon, and it is the home of the club's professional basketball (Apollon Patras) and volleyball teams. The arena has a seating capacity of 3,500 people.

The arena also includes an exercise and weight training room, a sauna, a reception area, a press interview room, and a separate practice facility.

History
Apollon Patras Indoor Hall opened in 1992. Originally, the arena only had tier columns of bleacher style seating, with no individual seats. However, in 2012, the arena was renovated and updated, and seats were added.

Gallery

References

External links

Information on the arena @ Stadia.gr
Apollon Patras Indoor Hall @ ApollonPatras.gr 
Image of Apollon Patras Indoor Hall Exterior
Image of Apollon Patras Indoor Hall Interior

Indoor arenas in Greece
Basketball venues in Greece
Volleyball venues in Greece
Apollon Patras B.C.